Malin Altherr (born 14 February 2003) is a Swiss female handballer for LC Brühl Handball in the Spar Premium League and the Swiss national team.

She made her official debut on the Swiss national team on 30 November 2018, against Lithuania. She represented Switzerland for the first time at the 2022 European Women's Handball Championship in Slovenia, Montenegro and North Macedonia.

Achievements
 SPAR Premium League
Bronze Medalist: 2022
 Swiss SuperCup
Winner: 2021

References

External links

2003 births
Living people
Swiss female handball players
21st-century Swiss women